Clay Cross is a civil parish in the North East Derbyshire district of Derbyshire, England.  The parish contains 13 listed buildings that are recorded in the National Heritage List for England.  All the listed buildings are designated at Grade II, the lowest of the three grades, which is applied to "buildings of national importance and special interest".  The parish contains the town of Clay Cross and the surrounding area.  The listed buildings consist of houses, cottages and associated structures, a church, a milepost, the portals of a railway tunnel, items in a cemetery, and a war memorial.


Buildings

References

Citations

Sources

 

Lists of listed buildings in Derbyshire